"Lorelei" is a song from rock band Styx. It is on their 1975 album Equinox, and was released as a single in 1976.

Background
The song peaked at #27 on the U.S. Billboard Hot 100 in April 1976 and was the band's second top 40 hit single. Lorelei also hit number six on the Canadian charts during the weeks of May 8 and 15, 1976.

Chicago radio superstation WLS, which gave the song much airplay, ranked "Lorelei" as the 77th most popular hit of 1976.  It reached as high as number eight (for two weeks) on their surveys of April 17 and 24, 1976.

Record World described the song as "a hard rocking number with overtones of The Who and Raspberries in its fiery rhythms.

"Lorelei" was one of the songs that Styx re-recorded for their Regeneration: Volume 1 EP in 2010 with James Young on lead vocals

Personnel
Dennis DeYoung: lead vocals, keyboards
James Young: lead guitar, backing vocals
John Curulewski: rhythm guitar, backing vocals
Chuck Panozzo: bass
John Panozzo: drums

Composition
"Lorelei" is written in D-major with a moderately fast rock tempo.

Chart performance

Weekly charts

Year-end charts

References

External links
 

1975 songs
1976 singles
Pop ballads
Songs written by Dennis DeYoung
Styx (band) songs
A&M Records singles